Krishikar Lok Party (Peasants Peoples Party), a political party in the Hyderabad State, India, existing April–June 1951. KLP was formed when Acharya N. G. Ranga broke away from the Hyderabad State Praja Party.

KLP contested the 1951 Lok Sabha elections, winning one seat.
KLP also contested 1952 Madras Legislative Assembly election and won 15 seats.

In the 1955 Andhra State Legislative Assembly election, Congress, Praja Party and KLP formed an alliance and KLP won 22 seats. After the election, on the request of Nehru, Ranga merged KLP with the Congress party. He was elected to Congress in the 1957 general election from Tenali Lok Sabha constituency.

Ranga would later become the founder-president of the Swatantra Party.

References 

Defunct political parties in Andhra Pradesh
Political parties established in 1951
1951 establishments in India
Political parties disestablished in 1951
1951 disestablishments in India
Conservative parties in India